Intimate and Live is the debut live album by Australian singer and songwriter Kylie Minogue. It was released on 30 November 1998 as a double CD set, and on 23 July 2002 as a DVD through BMG, Mushroom Records and Warner Vision. The concert was filmed at Capitol Theatre on 1 July 1998 from the Intimate and Live concert tour. Produced by David Wilson and directed by Mark Adamson and Michael Williams, both the album and DVD features twenty-one songs from the concert and spawned a promotional single, "Dancing Queen".

The tour was in support of Minogue's sixth studio album Impossible Princess, playing eight songs from the album. The album received positive reviews for Minogue's clear delivery with slight criticism towards the covers, the DVD edition received mixed reviews from music critics for its visuals and stage production. The album reached number twenty-eight on the Australian Albums Chart, her first and highest live album to chart alongside the 2007 live album Showgirl: Homecoming Live respectively. The DVD peaked at number one and was certified platinum by the Australian Recording Industry Association (ARIA) for shipments of 15,000 units.

Background and material

The album and DVD were recorded and filmed on 1 July 1998 at the Capitol Theatre in Sydney, Australia from the Intimate and Live concert tour. The photography used on the front cover was by Campbell Knott, while one image in the booklet is shot by Natalie Stevenson. Both the album and DVD cover sleeve was designed by Andrew Murabito, who worked directly through Mushroom for specialised artworks and cover designs. Both Minogue's creative designers, British musician and producer Steve Anderson and British fashion designer William Baker, produced the album and DVD, who at the time had no experience in touring or producing a live album. Despite this, both Anderson and Baker carried on producing her live work in the future.

The CD was released through Mushroom on 28 November 1998. It contains eight tracks from the supporting album Impossible Princess; "Too Far", "Some Kind of Bliss", "Breathe", "Cowboy Style", "Say Hey", "Drunk", "Did It Again", "Limbo" and two unreleased tracks "Free" and "Take Me With You", alongside previous material. In addition, Minogue performed two cover songs on the tour; "Dancing Queen" by Swedish group ABBA and "Should I Stay or Should I Go?" by American group The Clash. To promote the tour subsequently, Minogue and her Australian label Mushroom Records released "Dancing Queen" as a promotional single which also included the live version of "Cowboy Style". The VHS of the concert was released a month later through Roadshow Entertainment and Mushroom, featuring all twenty-one tracks from the album. The reverse spiral dual layer (RSDL) DVD was released on 23 July 2002 through Warner Vision and BMG in Australia, New Zealand and the United Kingdom, and featured all twenty-one tracks from the album. The video footage for "Cowboy Style" was used as its official music video, which was directed by Michael Williams.

Reception

Intimate and Live received favorable reviews from most music critics. While reviewing the concert tour and the CD/DVD versions, a reviewer from The Independent called the live performance "fantastic". The reviewer felt songs like "I Should be So Lucky" was "not only an inspired arrangement, but Kylie even sang it well: the helium she overdosed on in the late 1980s has worn off." Allmusic editor Chris True had highlighted tracks "Too Far", "What Do I Have to Do?" and "Limbo" as album stand outs. Although he rated it three stars and called the music "solid", he felt "her soft dance-pop version of the Clash's "Should I Stay or Should I Go?" is downright awful. Mainly for die-hard collectors, less familiar fans will want to check out a greatest-hits compilation or her 1997 album Impossible Princess." An editor from JB Hi-Fi had praised the DVD version, feeling she was "all grown up" and "Kylie truly was the prom-queen and this really was her homecoming." Pete Mellor from Michael DVD.co.au awarded the album three-and-a-half stars out of four, and the DVD two-and-a-half. For the album, he commended the quality by saying it was "clear" and was "able to understand", while he criticized the colour saturation and staging of the show and editing.

Due to the positive reception and success of the tour, Minogue had written an open note on the album booklet;

Commercial performance
Intimate and Live entered at number twenty-eight on the Australian Albums Chart, dropping to forty-six the following week, and falling out the chart. On 3 January 1999, the album re-entered at forty-one and stayed in the charts for four weeks. As a conjunction, Intimate and Live and Minogue's 2007 live album Showgirl: Homecoming Live are her highest charting live albums and her only live albums to chart in Australia. The DVD version peaked at number one in Australia and was certified platinum by the Australian Recording Industry Association (ARIA) with shipments of 15,000 units.

Track listings

Formats
CD and digital download – double disc containing two live CD's.
DVD – DVD keep case packed with the DVD.
Video download – The live performances of the tour.

Personnel
Adapted from the album liner notes.

Mark Adamson - director
Michael Warden - editing
Rob Fazzino - editing
Tim Parrington - editing
Alan 'Ternits' Bremner - mixing
David Wilson - producer
Ross Cockle - recording
Andrew Murabito - sleeve design

Charts

Certifications

References
Notes

References

External links
Kylie.com — official website.
Intimate & Live at iTunes.

1998 live albums
1998 video albums
Kylie Minogue live albums
Kylie Minogue video albums
Live video albums